James George Coleman (1824–1883) was an Anglo-Indian soldier, businessman and philanthropist who served as a member of the Madras Legislative Council from 1879 to 1883.

Career

Coleman was born in 1824 in India and was initially in the Marine Service. Later, he partnered Dr Angus McDowell, founder of  McDowell & Co in Madras and eventually rose to become the sole proprietor of the business.

Public life 

Coleman was involved in philanthropic activities right from the beginning and strove to uplift the Anglo-Indian community. He joined the Volunteer Movement and rose to become Lieutenant-Colonel in the Duke's Own Artillery Corps. He was also a member of the Madras Municipal Corporation. In 1879, he was nominated to the Madras Legislative Council and served from 1879 to 1883.

Death 

Coleman died at Royapuram, Madras on 14 December 1883.

References 

 

1824 births
1883 deaths
British Army officers